Eucalyptus medialis is a synonym of Eucalyptus hebetifolia.

See also
List of Eucalyptus species

References

Eucalypts of Western Australia
Trees of Australia
medialis
Myrtales of Australia
Plants described in 1991
Taxa named by Ian Brooker
Taxa named by Stephen Hopper